Caloptilia canadensisella is a moth of the family Gracillariidae. It is known from Canada (Nova Scotia and Québec).

The larvae feed on Cornus canadensis. They mine the leaves of their host plant.

References

canadensisella
Moths of North America
Moths described in 1956